Regionalliga Nord  may refer to a number of sports leagues in Northern Germany.

Football
 Regionalliga Nord, a tier-four league in German football.
 Regionalliga Nord (1963–1974), a now defunct tier-two league in German football, existing from 1963 to 1974.

Rugby union
 Rugby-Regionalliga Nord, a tier-three rugby union league in Germany.